Anna Lee Keys Worley (died 1961) was the first woman elected to the Tennessee Senate, representing Sullivan County.

Worley served as a Democrat in the Tennessee Senate beginning January 25, 1921. She was elected in a special election to replace her recently deceased husband.

One historian wrote that Worley "succeeded her antisuffragist husband in the Tennessee state senate and promptly used her powers to sponsor legislation to remove civil disabilities against Tennessee's women".

Worley left the Senate in 1923 after serving one term. She died on May 3, 1961 in Boswell, Indiana.

Sources

Year of birth missing
1961 deaths
Democratic Party Tennessee state senators
Women state legislators in Tennessee
20th-century American politicians
20th-century American women politicians
People from Sullivan County, Tennessee